The 1949 Glasgow Corporation elections were held on Tuesday 3 May 1949. The election was held against a wider backdrop of Labour losses across the country, however Labour managed to maintain an overall majority of elected members. The Labour group did see a particularly high-profile loss when the Labour group leader Andrew Hood, the councillor for Provan, lost his seat. The new council was composed entirely of Labour and Progressive members, with all smaller parties having lost their representation.

Whilst the Labour party had won a majority of elected members, the corporation also featured two ex-officio members: the Dean of Guild (Lord Inverclyde) and the Deacon-Convenor. Whilst not party affiliated, these members had traditionally voted with the Progressives. As a result, following the election the Progressives John Donald Kelly took over as council leader; the first Progressive council leader since 1933, when Labour had taken control.

Election result

Wards

Anderston

Calton

Camphill

Cathcart

Cowcaddens

Cowlairs

Craigton

Dalmarnock

Dennistoun

Exchange

Fairfield

Gorbals

Govanhill

Hutchesontown

Kelvinside

Kingston

Kinning Park

Knightswood

Langside

Maryhill

Mile-end

North Kelvin

Park

Parkhead

Partick East

Patrick West

Pollockshaws

Provan

Ruchill

Shettleston

Springburn

Townhead

Whiteinch

Woodside

Yoker

References

Glasgow Corporation election
1949
Corporation election, 1949
Glasgow Corporation election